Chen Hsiu-hsi (Hsinchu, 1921–1991), also known as Chen Xiuxi, was a Taiwanese poet. She published her first book of poetry in Japanese in 1970.

References 

1921 births
1991 deaths
Taiwanese poets
Taiwanese women writers
People from Hsinchu County